Krista Erika Kosonen (born 28 May 1983) is a Finnish actress. She is known for her appearances in movies such as Jade Warrior (2006), Princess (2010), and the Norwegian HBO series Beforeigners (2019, 2021). She has also appeared in the sketch comedy television show Putous (2010–2014). Kosonen was selected Best Actress at the Shanghai International Film Festival for her performance in Wildeye (2015). She has also won two Jussi Awards for Best Leading Actress, in 2016 for Wildeye and in 2018 for Miami.

Personal life
Krista Kosonen is married to movie director Antti J. Jokinen. They have two children together, a daughter (born 2015) and son (born 2022).

Selected filmography

Film

Television

References

External links

 

1983 births
21st-century Finnish actresses
Finnish film actresses
Finnish television actresses
Living people
People from Espoo